Winters Cut is the name of three streams (brooks) or drainage ditchs of the Pevensey Levels in the civil parish of Westham, Wealden District of East Sussex, England. All streams are located just northeast of the boundary with the civil parish of Polegate, which is marked by the A27 road.

Streams 
The second, -long stream rises at Otham Court Ditch and flows northeasterly into Marland Sewer. After receiving the waters of Wadham New Cut, this Winters Cut stream merges with Duckpuddle to give rise to Otham Court Ditch.

References 

Rivers of East Sussex
Rivers of the Pevensey Levels